The Cesina family is an Italian family of Roman-Lombard origin.

Origins
The Cesina family takes its surname from the fiefdom, being vassals of the Lombard dukes of Duchy of Benevento.
Initially the fiefdom, was a wooded area designated for wood cutting and later converted into an agricultural field, formed in 664 as a reward to the vassal by the Lombard king Grimoald, King of Italy. 

The fiefdom Cesina was originally included in the gastaldate of Aquino, which controlled the entire territory of Cassino, and it had considerable strategic importance in guarding the borders of the Duchy of Benevento.
The vassals preserved the fief for the dukes and then princes of Benevento, until 883, when the territory was devastated
from the arrival of the Saracens, who came from Agropoli at the invitation of Docibilis I, Duke of Gaeta, who destroyed the Abbey of Montecassino. 
The survivors took refuge in Presenzano. After the Battle of Garigliano, in 915, the fiefdom was included to the Principality of Capua.

In 1019, the fiefdom was claimed by Abbot of Montecassino Atenulf  who requested its restitution from his brother, the Lombard prince Pandulf IV of Capua.
With the end of the Lombard domains in Italy in 1077, conquered by the Normans, under the leadership of the famous Robert Guiscard and added to their County of Sicily, the fiefdom became possediment of the Di Sangro family, heirs of the Counts of Marsi.

Notable members 
 Giuseppe Cesina, Secretary of Kingdom of Sicily from 1678 to 1688, at service Viceroys of Sicily, under King Charles II of Spain.
 Giovanni Giacomo Cesina, born in Bosco, Principato Citra, Kingdom of Naples, Doctor of Law, 1724  
 Eugenio Cesina, Assessor of Venice, Kingdom of Lombardy–Venetia in 1848, witness of the interrogation in prison of the Italian patriot Daniele Manin.

Family tree

See also
 Cesina
 Cesina (surname)
 Kingdom of the Lombards
 Duchy of Benevento
 Terra Sancti Benedicti
 Duchy of Rome
 Principality of Capua
 Origo Gentis Langobardorum
 Edictum Rothari
 History of the Lombards
 Early Middle Ages
 History of Italy

References

Bibliography
 Berardo Candida Gonzaga, Count,  Memorie delle famiglie nobili delle province meridionali d'Italia, vol. 1 e 6, Bologna, Arnaldo Forni Editore, 1875.

Lombards
History of Lombardy
Duchy of Benevento
Lombard warriors
Lombard families
Italian families
7th-century establishments in Italy